CKLF-FM is a Canadian radio station serving Brandon, Manitoba at 94.7 FM. The station uses its on-air brand name Star 94.7 with a hot adult contemporary format.

CKLF is owned and operated by Westman Radio Ltd, a subsidiary of Westman Communications Group. It's housed, along with CKLQ-FM, at 624 14th Street East, on Brandon's northeast side.

History
On September 17, 1999, Riding Mountain Broadcasting was licensed by the CRTC to operate a new FM radio station at Brandon on the frequency 94.7 MHz.

In September 2022, Westman announced the sale of CKLF and CKLQ to Pattison Media.

References

External links
Star 94.7
 
Decision CRTC 99-439

Klf
Media cooperatives in Canada
Klf
Radio stations established in 2000
2000 establishments in Manitoba